Radial Mountain, elevation , is a mountain in Grand and Jackson counties in northern Colorado. The mountain lies in the Rabbit Ears Range east of Parkview Mountain and east of Willow Creek Pass. Radial Mountain lies on the Continental Divide, and the Continental Divide National Scenic Trail passes along the south side of the peak.

Geology
Several magmatic dikes radiate out from the mountain, and some are visible from Colorado State Highway 125, which goes over Willow Creek Pass just west of Radial Mountain.

Climbing
Radial Mountain is among the most accessible to hike in the Rabbit Ears Range. It's close to Willow Creek Pass, where the Continental Divide Trail passes the highway. The trail doesn't go to the peak's summit, but it brings hikers partly there, then from that point, one can hike through the trees to the summit.

References 

Mountains of Colorado
Mountains of Grand County, Colorado
Mountains of Jackson County, Colorado
North American 3000 m summits